Schippelsweg is a metro station in Niendorf, Hamburg, on the Hamburg U-Bahn line U2.

History
In 1984, construction began to extend the Hagenbecks Tierpark-Niendorf Markt section of the U2, which opened on 1 June 1985, further to Niendorf Nord. This last section of the U2 was supposed to open in 1987,  but complaints from area residents and problems with a high groundwater level made construction four years longer than it was supposed to last.

On 9 March 1991 the extension, and with it Schippelsweg station, was officially opened by the First Mayor of Hamburg, Henning Voscherau, with senators Wilhelm Rahlfs and Eugen Wagner in attendance.

Services
Schippelsweg is served by Hamburg U-Bahn line U2.

References 

Hamburg U-Bahn stations in Hamburg
U2 (Hamburg U-Bahn) stations
Buildings and structures in Eimsbüttel
Railway stations in Germany opened in 1991